Humanity's Last Stand is a fictional radical anti-mutant fringe group appearing in American comic books published by Marvel Comics. The characters are depicted as enemies of the X-Men. The group's first appearance was in Uncanny X-Men Annual 1995.

History
Humanity's Last Stand was behind the creation of a false Mutant Liberation Front, formed by human members of H.L.S. posing as mutants. The humans use drugs and or technologically enhanced suits in order to mimic mutant powers. The goal of this is to discredit mutants. They also attempted to murder humans who sympathized with mutants, which led them to battle the Punisher and his allies.

Members
 Simon Trask - Founder and brother of Bolivar Trask. He has a technological wire in his body.
 Eli Garibaldi -
 Joelle Guthrie - Quit
 Tim Preacher - Quit
 Lieutenant Commander Coral Trent -
 Commander Jared McGee -
 Sean Lockwood -
 Hound -
 The Razors - Robots with techno-organic armor. They were later found and utilized by the Cabots against the Guthries and the X-Men
 The Shepherds - Robots incorporating Nimrod technology.

Mutant Liberation Front
Agents of Humanity's Last Stand, this group were normal humans given drugs or costumes to empower them. They claimed to be mutants in order to defame mutants. One of their major tasks was the attempted assassination Reverend William Connover. Among its members are:

 Deadeye (Antonio LeBlanco) - He wears armor that allows him to fire plasma blasts from his eye. He is a former Mafioso. He is slain by the mutant-obsessed X-Cutioner. His corpse is destroyed by Blast Furnace to prevent an autopsy.
 Deadeye (clone) - A clone of the original. It was presumably slain in the destruction of Humanity's Last Stand's base.
 Blast Furnace - A robot that could incinerate compromised members. It is operated by remote control. After destroying Deadeye's corpse, it destroys itself.
 Blast Furnace II - A second version of the original. It was destroyed by the Punisher.
 Corpus Delecti (Charles Spencer) - A melding of a dead person and mechanics. This entity has superhuman strength, immunity to most forms of harm and a personal energy field. When the team's original mission is compromised, he is incinerated by Blast Furnace.
 Corpus Delecti (clone) - A clone of the original. Killed by the Punisher.
 Blindspot (Rose Smith) - She could generate flashes of light from her hands. She is killed by Simon Trask when she refused to battle the Punisher.
 Thermal (Harry Riddle) - He could generate blasts of heat or cold. He is likely killed when Simon Trask destroys their base.

In other media

Television
 Simon Trask is seen in Iron Man: Armored Adventures. In the episode "The X-Factor", he is attacked by Magneto for being a member of Humanity Now. Trask is eventually found wrapped in a pipe by Iron Man before Magneto attacks while Senator Robert Kelly's campaign mentions what happened to Trask to the media.

References

External links
 Humanity's Last Stand at Marvel Wiki

Marvel Comics supervillain teams
X-Men supporting characters